Lerotholi Polytechnic Football Club is a Lesotho football club based in Maseru. It takes its name from the tertiary institution in Maseru, Lerotholi polytechnic, which was founded by and named after Paramount Chief Lerotholi.

The team was relegated from the Lesotho Premier League at the end of the 2010–11 season and, as of 2014–15, has played in the A-Division since then.

Achievements
 Lesotho Cup: 1
1996

Performance in CAF competitions
 African Cup Winners' Cup: 1 appearance
1997 – First Round

References

Football clubs in Lesotho
Maseru
Association football clubs established in 1906
University and college association football clubs
1906 establishments in the British Empire